Atlas Aircraft was a short-lived American aircraft manufacturer founded at Hemet, California by J.B. Alexander and Max B. Harlow shortly after World War II. The firm developed a light civil aircraft, the H-10, based on a pre-war design by Harlow but was unable to find buyers for it.

References

 

Hemet, California
Defunct aircraft manufacturers of the United States
Defunct companies based in Greater Los Angeles
Manufacturing in Riverside County, California